This is a list of World War I films.



Feature films

* Genre: Drama, Action/Adventure, Romance, Comedy, Musical, Family, Lost film.
☞ Source material: Novel, Play, Memoir, Book (non-fiction), Short story, Children's book, Verse (poetry), Article.
≈≈≈

Television films and series 

* Genre: Drama, Action/Adventure, Romance, Comedy, Musical, Family.
☞ Source material: Novel, Play, Memoir, Book (non-fiction), Short story, Children's book, Verse (poetry), Article.

(Science) fiction and fantasy

☞ Source material: Novel, Play, Memoir, Book (non-fiction), Short story, Children's book, Verse (poetry), Article.

Documentary

Derived conflicts

Anglo-Irish War and Irish Civil War

* Genre: Drama, Action/Adventure, Romance, Comedy, Musical, Family.
☞ Source material: Novel, Play, Memoir, Book (non-fiction), Short story, Children's book, Verse (poetry), Article.

Russian Revolution and Russian Civil War

* Genre: Drama, Action/Adventure, Romance, Comedy, Musical, Family.
☞ Source material: Novel, Play, Memoir, Book (non-fiction), Short story, Children's book, Verse (poetry), Article.

Grigori Rasputin

Turkish War of Independence

* Genre: Drama, Action/Adventure, Romance, Comedy, Musical, Family.
☞ Source material: Novel, Play, Memoir, Book (non-fiction), Short story, Children's book, Verse (poetry), Article.

See also
List of World War I video games
List of World War II films

Notes

 This English language title is a literal translation from its original foreign language title.This title should always be replaced by an English language release title when that information becomes available.

References

Lists of war films
Films
Films

History of fiction